"En enda gång", lyrics by Hans Skoog and music Martin Klaman, is a power ballad which Kikki Danielsson performed when it finished fourth at the Swedish Melodifestivalen 1992. Kikki Danielsson had throat problems, which caused her voice to become more hoarse than usual. However, this didn't seem to affect the result in a negative way, since the song reminded of those heavy mer ballads with hoarse singer remaining popularity at that time.

The lyrics is natural romantic, like many other Kikki Danielssons songs. In "En enda gång", Swedish for "Only one time", the singer describes its love as several natural phenomenas.

Svensktoppen
"En enda gång" stayed on the Swedish chart Svensktoppen for one week, where it was on the 10th place.

References

Information at Svensk mediedatabas

Kikki Danielsson songs
Melodifestivalen songs of 1992
Rock ballads
1990s ballads
1992 songs
Swedish-language songs